Marenisco is an unincorporated community and census-designated place (CDP) in Marenisco Township, Gogebic County, Michigan, in the United States. As of the 2010 census, the CDP had a population of 254, out of a total population in the township of 1,727. The name of the community and the township was formed by combining the first three letters from Mary Enid Scott, the wife of E. H. Scott, a timber producer.

The community is located in the western part of Marenisco Township, in the western part of Michigan's Upper Peninsula. U.S. Route 2 runs along the northern edge of the community, leading east  to Watersmeet and west  to Wakefield. State highway M-64 passes through the center of Marenisco, leading south  to the Wisconsin border.

The community of Marenisco was listed as a newly organized census-designated place for the 2010 census, meaning it now has officially defined boundaries and population statistics for the first time. The community is bounded to the east by the Presque Isle River, which flows to Lake Superior in northeastern Gogebic County.

Demographics

References

Census-designated places in Gogebic County, Michigan
Census-designated places in Michigan
Unincorporated communities in Gogebic County, Michigan
Unincorporated communities in Michigan